Brendon Groenewald (born 27 May 1991 in Johannesburg, South Africa) is a South African rugby union player, currently playing with KwaZulu-Natal club side Durban Collegians. He is a utility forward that can play as a lock, flanker or number eight.

Career

School rugby

At high school level, Groenewald represented KwaZulu-Natal in provincial youth weeks in three consecutive years – he played for them at the Under-16 Grant Khomo Week in 2007, the Under-18 Academy Week competition in 2008 and the Under-18 Craven Week competition in 2009.

Free State Cheetahs

In 2010, he moved to Bloemfontein, where he joined the  academy. He made just seven starts for the  side during the 2010 Under-19 Provincial Championship before he was promoted to the  side, for whom he made five appearances in 2010 and scoring three tries, including two in their match against .

It proved to be a memorable debut, as he also scored his first senior try in the final minutes of the match as his side ran out 55–19 winners. He started their first five matches of the competition (scoring one more try against Namibian side ) and played off the bench in their next two matches, as well as the quarter-final, where the Free State XV were knocked out by eventual winners, Argentinean side .

He returned to Under-21 action in the second half of 2011, scoring two tries in nine starts for the  side in the 2011 Under-21 Provincial Championship.

Sharks / Durban Collegians

He made two appearances for them during the 2012 Vodacom Cup competition. Still eligible to play at Under-21 level, he played in all thirteen of the s' matches during the 2012 Under-21 Provincial Championship, scoring three tries as they reached the semi-final of the competition.

He played club rugby for Durban Collegians in the 2013 Moor Cup, helping them to second place in the league and went one better in the 2014 Moor Cup when he was the top try-scorer in the league to help them win the title and qualify for the 2015 SARU Community Cup.

Return to Free State Cheetahs

His performances for Durban Collegians didn't go unnoticed and  Rory Duncan brought him back to Bloemfontein as lock and loose-forward cover during the 2014 Currie Cup Premier Division season.

Durban Collegians

In 2015, Groenewald returned to Durban to rejoin club side Durban Collegians prior to their 2015 SARU Community Cup campaign.

References

South African rugby union players
Living people
1991 births
Rugby union players from Johannesburg
Rugby union locks
Rugby union flankers
Rugby union number eights
Free State Cheetahs players
Sharks (Currie Cup) players